Westbrook Center is a census-designated place (CDP) comprising the primary village and adjacent residential land in the town of Westbrook, Middlesex County, Connecticut, United States. It is in the southern part of the town, along U.S. Route 1 and bordered to the south by Long Island Sound. To the east it is bordered by the town of Old Saybrook, and the west and northwest border of the CDP is the Patchogue River. As of the 2020 census, the CDP had a population of 2,220, out of 6,769 in the entire town of Westbrook.

The Westbrook Town Center Historic District occupies  at the center of the community.

References 

Census-designated places in Middlesex County, Connecticut
Census-designated places in Connecticut